William Maxwell Reed (January 12, 1871 in Bath, Maine – September 1962), a.k.a. W. Maxwell Reed, was a pioneering U.S. author of illustrated science books for children.

After schooling at Harvard, he taught astronomy at Harvard and Princeton University.

Reed later went into the steel industry.

Beginning as a series of letters to his nephew, his first book, The Earth for Sam, was published in 1929. The book remains popular and was republished in 2005.

Earth was followed by a series of popular children's information books, many published by Harcourt, Brace.

Books
The Earth for Sam; the story of mountains, rivers, dinosaurs and men (1929). Illustrated by biologist/artist James Howard McGregor.
The Stars for Sam (1931). Illustrated by Karl Moseley.
And that's why (1932)
The Sea for Sam (w/ Wilfred S. Bronson) (1935)
Animals on the March (w/ Jannette May Lucas) (1937)
America's Treasure (1939)
The Sky is Blue (illustrated by James MacDonald) (1940)
Patterns In The Sky: The Story Of The Constellations (1951)

References 

1871 births
1962 deaths
American children's writers
American science writers
American astronomers
Harvard University alumni
Harvard University faculty
Princeton University faculty
People from Bath, Maine
Writers from Maine